Clover Food Lab is a vegetarian fast food chain, founded in 2008 which operates food trucks and restaurants in Massachusetts, United States. The company serves a simple menu that changes daily and with the seasons based on what is available from local farmers and includes a large mix of organic ingredients. The company also offers meal delivery boxes and catering.

Overview
The company was founded in October 2008, by MIT material science graduate and Harvard MBA Ayr Muir, as one food truck serving the area around the Massachusetts Institute of Technology (MIT).  As of summer 2018, Clover Food Lab had some 400 employees operating in 12 restaurants across the greater Boston area.

Environmental vision
The company was founded by Ayr Muir, a graduate of MIT in Material Science and Harvard Business School MBA program. Muir, a distant cousin of naturalist John Muir, has cited environmental motivations as a driving force behind the company's creation. He wishes "to shrink the ecological footprint of the food industry by making fresh, local, sustainable vegetarian food as common and convenient as the fare at Burger King or McDonald's". The company's food trucks are decommissioned and retrofitted cargo vehicles that use recycled vegetable oil to help them run.  All of the company's utensils, napkins, and other items are compostable.  Despite Clover Food Lab's focus on local, sustainable and vegetarian food, Muir consciously avoids branding the company's food as such, fearing that "no one will eat it if we do".

Design
Clover Food Lab's trucks and restaurants have minimalist, somewhat industrial design, and include elements that give them the look and feel of a laboratory.  The sides and walls are plain white, menus are written on whiteboards with black dry-erase marker, and the restaurants are brightly lit and have mostly stool seating.  The kitchen has "a pop-up quality, as if the crew is here temporarily, planning to relocate elsewhere." Staff enter customer orders and process credit and debit cards through an iPod Touch system, and give change from their money belts instead of cash registers.

Reception

Clover Food Lab's BLT sandwich uses soy bacon, and has been cited as the best BLT sandwich in Boston by Mayor Thomas Menino. The company was a winner of the Food Truck Challenge, a competition initiated by Menino to bring healthy mobile food vending to Boston, which has led to a rising trend in the city in the use of food and coffee trucks. Clover Food Lab was named one of the top 10 food trucks in the United States by The Wall Street Journal, and given the 2011 Best of Boston award for vegetarian food by The Improper Bostonian.  The company was one of several food truck services highlighted by The Huffington Post for its intense use of technology (especially social media), distinctive product, and cult-like following. In 2016, it was named the best farm-to-table restaurant in Massachusetts by Travel + Leisure.

Pay What You Want Day 
Typically held on the first day of operations of a new Clover location, Pay What You Want Day allows the area to get to know the food and for the staff to work out their pace. In 2015, Pay What You Want Day was experienced in Central Square with the opening of CloverHFI.

In 2016, Clover Food Lab opened the doors to three new locations and one food truck all featuring Pay What You Want Day. All proceeds made during the openings were donated to The Food Project.

Kosher Certification 

Most Clover locations are certified kosher by Lighthouse Kosher, a kosher certification agency under Rabbi Barry Dolinger of Providence, RI.

References

Further reading
Architect Newspaper article, 2017
Harvard Gazette article, 2017
BostInno article, 2016
Harvard Crimson article, 2016
Business Journal article, 2016
Boston Magazine article, Making of a McTopia, 2014
Fast Company article: Quest to become the vegetarian McDonalds, 2014
Boston Globe, 2014
Boston Globe, 2013
USA Today, 2013

External links
Official website

Culture of Boston
Economy of Boston
Companies based in Cambridge, Massachusetts
Restaurants established in 2008
Vegetarian companies and establishments of the United States
Fast-food chains of the United States
Food trucks
2008 establishments in Massachusetts